This is a list of apple dishes, that use apple as a primary ingredient. Apple beverages are also included on this list.

Apple Dishes

See also

 Apple cider vinegar
 Apple Day
 Cooking apple
 List of apple cultivars
 List of culinary fruits
 List of fruit dishes

References

 
Apple dishes